Devanga Higher Secondary School, Coimbatore is a Tamil Nadu Government aided, boys only school, located in the city of Coimbatore, Tamil Nadu, India. Founded by Shri S.R.P. Ponnusamy Chettiar, it offers education from Standard 1 to Standard 12 as per the Tamil Nadu Higher Secondary board or Tamil Nadu State Board syllabus. It is an English and Tamil medium school.

Members of the Rotary Club of Coimbatore Midtown meet every Wednesday at SRP Rotary Meeting Hall, Devanga Higher Secondary School.

Most of the TN State-board and Public and TNPSC exams held at Devanga Higher Secondary School.

Infrastructure
The school has a huge campus and a playground which are surrounded by trees, making it look picturesque. It has separate blocks for standard 1 to 5, standard 6 to 10, and standard 11 and 12. Founder SRP Ponnusamy Chettiar's statue is placed at the entrance.

The school has laboratories for physics, chemistry, biology and computers, as well as a library. The school has well maintained playground for Football, Basketball, and Volleyball.

Sports
The school has facilities for basketball, football, volleyball, hockey, and baseball

Events
The school conducts NCC Day, Republic Day, Sports Day, Annual Day every year. On Independence Day i.e. 15 August, parade by members of NCC is a local attraction.

Uniform

Wings
The school has following wings which grooms students in various aspects.

NCC
Junior Red Cross – Student's Wing of the Red Cross
The Bharat Scouts and Guides
National Service Scheme

Competitions
School celebrates Sports and Annual Day. It conducts drawing, essay writing, elocution, dance, singing, quiz and poetry among other activities.
Sports such as football, cricket, baseball, volleyball, hockey, badminton, basketball, and relay race are conducted every year.

Address
Devanga Higher Secondary School 
No 17, Devanga High School Road, Coimbatore - 641002 
Phone #: +(91)-(422)-2551782

External links 
 The Hindu Newspaper Dated 3 November 2009
 The Hindu Newspaper Dated 24 November 2009
 Rotary Club of Coimbatore Midtown
 TNPSC Exams

References

Boys' schools in India
Primary schools in Tamil Nadu
High schools and secondary schools in Tamil Nadu
Schools in Coimbatore
Tamil-language schools